Roy Francis Kennedy, Baron Kennedy of Southwark,  (born 9 November 1962) is a British Labour and Co-operative politician and life peer serving as Opposition Chief Whip in the House of Lords since 2021.

Early life
Born in Lambeth, London to Irish parents, Kennedy grew up on the Aylesbury Estate in Southwark. His mother, Frances, worked in the Member’s Tea Room in the House of Commons. He attended St Joseph's Primary School in Camberwell and St Thomas the Apostle School in Peckham.

Political career
In 1986, at the age of 23, Kennedy was elected to represent Newington ward on Southwark Council. He subsequently held several positions on the Council, including Deputy Leader, and was appointed an Honorary Alderman in 2007.

Employed as a full-time Labour Party staffer from 1990, he became an organiser in Coventry, West Midlands the following year. Kennedy helped defeat Militant MP Dave Nellist in Coventry South East at the 1992 general election, who had been deselected as Labour's candidate. He moved to the East Midlands in 1994, where he served as Labour's Regional Director from 1997 to 2005. Kennedy took up the national role of Director of Finance and Compliance in 2005.

Soon after leaving the employment of Labour in September 2010, Kennedy was appointed as an Electoral Commissioner following a nomination by the party. He chose to seek election to Lewisham Council rather than serve a second term on the Commission, and was elected to represent Crofton Park ward from May 2014 to May 2018.

House of Lords 
Kennedy was made a life peer in Gordon Brown's dissolution honours list in 2010. He was created Baron Kennedy of Southwark, of Newington in the London Borough of Southwark, on 21 June 2010. He made his maiden speech in the House of Lords on 21 July 2010. During his tenure in Parliament, Kennedy has been Chair of the All Party Parliamentary Group (APPG) on Voter Registration, Vice Chair of the APPG on Credit Unions and a member of the Co-operative Party Parliamentary Group.

He first joined the opposition frontbench as a whip from October 2011 to September 2012. Kennedy returned to the role in September 2015 and was also appointed as a shadow spokesperson for Communities and Local Government, Housing and Home Affairs. 

Kennedy was elected unopposed as Opposition Chief Whip in the Lords in June 2021, and stepped down as an opposition Home Affairs and Cabinet Office spokesperson. He was appointed to the Cabinet Office role less than a month earlier, and stepped down from his remaining spokesperson roles in December 2021. As Opposition Chief Whip, he became Deputy Chair of the Lords Committees and a shadow cabinet attendee.

Personal life
Kennedy is married to Alicia, former Deputy General Secretary of the Labour Party, who sits alongside him as a life peer in the Lords. She also served alongside him on Lewisham Council from 2014 to 2016.

He is a supporter of Millwall Football Club.

References

External links 

 Profile at Parliament of the United Kingdom

1962 births
Living people
Councillors in the London Borough of Southwark
Labour Party (UK) life peers
Life peers created by Elizabeth II
Councillors in the London Borough of Lewisham
Labour Party (UK) councillors
Members of the Fabian Society
Spouses of life peers
Members of the Privy Council of the United Kingdom